Fever High is a Brooklyn-based duo composed of singer/instrumentalists Anna Nordeen and Reni Lane. The original formation of Fever High was composed of Nordeen and model/actress Leah Cary. Their five-track debut EP, All Work, was re-released in 2016 by Sire Records after being released independently in 2015. The band also included producer Adam Schlesinger. The group independently released their debut full-length FHNY on November 10, 2017. Pop culture blog The Nerdist called their debut single, "Tantalized", "ideal dance music for the summer." In 2020, former member Adam Schlesinger died of complications related to COVID-19.

The original formation of Fever High included model, actress, and musician Leah Cary. Fever High took shape in the summer of 2013 at the studio of the band’s producer/member, Adam Schlesinger (Fountains of Wayne). “Leah and I would come over to Adam’s studio and sing on demo tracks he would be writing for various things. We would joke about the three of us starting a band,” Nordeen told Bedford + Bowery. “Next thing I know, we’re thinking up band names. Adam wrote a few songs to get us started and now we all collaborate.”

Members

Reni Lane
Reni Lane plays numerous instruments, including piano, guitar, bass, trumpet and trombone. Lane released a solo album on Universal Motown and has since collaborated and/or toured with The Like, Joseph Arthur, Dave Stewart, Linda Perry and Howie Day.

Anna Nordeen
Anna Nordeen is a singer, guitarist and songwriter. Nordeen has released a solo EP, "You Know Where I Am", along with acting in various independent films.

Former Members

Leah Cary
Original member with Nordeen until she was silently replaced by Reni Lane. Cary is a model, actress, singer, and fashion designer. Dated Adam Schlessinger.

Discography

Albums/EPs 
 All Work (Independent) 2015
 All Work EP - re-issue with new track added (Sire Records) June 24, 2016
 FHNY (Independent) November 10, 2017

Singles 
 "Tantalized" (Independent) 2015
 "Tantalized" (Sire Records re-release) June 24, 2016
 "All Work" (Sire Records) September 23, 2016

External links 
 Official website
http://theabsolutemag.com/13505/music/fever-high-all-work/
https://eqmusicblog.com/emerging-artists-fever-high/#

References 

Musical groups from Brooklyn
American pop music duos
American synth-pop groups
Musical groups established in 2015
Female musical duos
2015 establishments in New York City